Basilia fletcheri is parasitic bat fly in the genus Basilia, in the subgenus Basilia. It is found in India.

Taxonomic history

Hugh Scott described this species in 1914. He named it after its collector, Thomas Bainbrigge Fletcher. Two specimens, a male and a female, were discovered on a Dormer's bat in Tamil Nadu, India. Scott placed this species in the genus Penicillidia . In 1956, Oskar Theodor classified it as belonging to the Basilia  genus, which is in the same subfamily as Penicillidia.

Range

It was discovered in Chennai. Scott later reported that Joseph Charles Bequaert sent him a specimen from Bengaluru, which Scott identified as this species, but Theodor later wrote this specimen was in fact B. punctuata; other places specimens have been collected include Navapur and Mumbai.

Hosts
Hosts which specimens have been collected from include: Dormer's bats Scotozous dormeri and Lesser bamboo bats Tylonycteris pachypus.

Description
It is about 2.5 mm long and has a yellowish color.

References

Further reading

External links

  

Insects described in 1914
Parasites of bats
Wingless Diptera
Fauna of India